The ninth and final season of How I Met Your Mother, an American sitcom created by Carter Bays and Craig Thomas, premiered on CBS on September 23, 2013, with two episodes, and concluded on March 31, 2014. The show was renewed for the final season on December 21, 2012, after cast member Jason Segel changed his decision to leave the show after Season 8. Cristin Milioti, who was revealed as "The Mother" in the Season 8 finale, was promoted to a series regular, the only time How I Met Your Mother added a new regular cast member. Season 9 consists of 24 episodes, each running approximately 22 minutes in length.

Taking place immediately after where the previous season left off, Season 9 covers the events of a single weekend that leads up to Barney (Neil Patrick Harris) and Robin's (Cobie Smulders) wedding. During the course of the weekend, "The Mother" (Milioti) is separately introduced to  Robin, Barney, Lily (Alyson Hannigan), and Marshall (Jason Segel), before finally meeting Ted (Josh Radnor). The season also features frequent flashbacks and flashforwards in order to fully integrate The Mother's character with the rest of the cast. Thomas said in an interview that Season 9 is like "the Wild West – anything can happen".

In February 2013, Bays and Thomas teased that Season 9 is "going to be a new way to tell the story". The initial reaction to the new storytelling structure of Season 9 was mixed. Ethan Anderton from Screen Rant was concerned about how "24 episodes of television are going to be crafted from just three days of time", and Alan Sepinwall of HitFix was exasperated that after eight seasons, "They are really going to stretch Robin and Barney's wedding weekend out over the entire final season", though he expressed more optimism after the San Diego Comic-Con panel for the final season.

Casting
The ninth season features a cast of six actors who receive star billing. Josh Radnor, Jason Segel, Cobie Smulders, Neil Patrick Harris, and Alyson Hannigan all reprise their roles in this season. Cristin Milioti, who was revealed as The Mother in the Season 8 finale, has been promoted to series regular, a first for the series.

How I Met Your Mother was initially scheduled to run for eight seasons after CBS ordered a seventh and eighth season in 2011. The show gained a resurgence in ratings during season seven, and CBS began discussing the possibility of ordering a ninth season. By 2012, Deadline Hollywood reported that CBS, 20th Century Fox, and all regular cast members except Segel wanted to continue with a ninth season. Segel had initially wanted to focus on his film career, leaving the fate of a ninth season uncertain. Co-creator Carter Bays observed that the negotiations were stressful, with a lot of "white-knuckled, nail-biting going on", but claimed that he was "confident that everything would work out". Craig Thomas noted the flexibility of the show's filming schedule, saying: "We've always done everything humanly possible to allow [the actors] to do other things." Segel ultimately decided to sign on for the final season, and Season 9 was announced on December 21, 2012. Thomas and Bays were relieved that a deal had been reached for another season, fearing that having to wrap up the show in Season 8 would have "felt rushed" and been "disappointing".

Bays and Thomas were first introduced to Milioti as a possibility for playing The Mother through casting director Marisa Ross. Narrowing down the candidates to three actresses early on allowed the casting department to avoid a publicized casting call for The Mother. Milioti was flown into Los Angeles to do an on-camera "chemistry test" with Radnor as part of her audition. Harris, who is a Broadway fan and had recognized her in the makeup trailer, gave Milioti a hug and exclaimed "You're The Mother!" before she was actually cast. Milioti was chosen partly because her musical history and time on Broadway, including her performance in Once, would have allowed her to play the role of The Mother, a musician, more convincingly. Bays and Thomas wanted to avoid casting someone who was well-known, fearing that the audiences' preconceptions of a famous actress might spill into her performance in the role. Milioti's casting was well received by critics, many of whom lauded the show for resisting the urge to cast a familiar face and instead opting for a relative unknown. Bill Kuchman from TV.com observed that, because "Milioti is a blank canvas to many of us", she has the "freedom to create a How I Met Your Mother character that's free of the burden of being compared to her past work".

When asked at Comic-Con about guest stars, Bays revealed that, "If there's someone we loved over the course of the series, there's a good chance they're coming back [for the final season]." Returning guest stars include Wayne Brady and John Lithgow as Barney's brother and father, respectively, and Ellen D. Williams as Robin's co-worker Patrice.

Also reprising their roles as Ted's teenage daughter and son in "The Year 2030" are Lyndsy Fonseca and David Henrie. For the bulk of the series' run, stock footage of a younger Fonseca and Henrie from the series' first season have been used, the better to reflect the kids not aging while hearing their father tell his story. The kids' scenes included one key moment filmed before production on Season 2 began; that scene, according to Bays and Thomas, served as the climax to Ted's story of how he and the kids' mother met. The climax was filmed on a set closed to everyone except Bays, Thomas, a camera operator, and Fonseca and Henrie, who signed non-disclosure agreements. Fonseca states she had forgotten the details of the scene in the years since its filming, while Henrie states, "I do remember. I think I remember. We'll see."

Main cast
 Josh Radnor as Ted Mosby
 Jason Segel as Marshall Eriksen
 Cobie Smulders as Robin Scherbatsky
 Neil Patrick Harris as Barney Stinson
 Cristin Milioti as The Mother/Tracy McConnell
 Alyson Hannigan as Lily Aldrin
 Bob Saget as future Ted Mosby (voice only) (uncredited)

Recurring cast and guest stars

 Lyndsy Fonseca as Ted's future daughter, Penny Mosby
 David Henrie as Ted's future son, Luke Mosby
 Robert Belushi as Linus, The Bartender
 Sherri Shepherd as Daphne
 Wayne Brady as James Stinson
 Marshall Manesh as Ranjit
 William Zabka as himself
 Roger Bart as Curtis
 Tim Gunn as himself/Barney's Personal Tailor
 Frances Conroy as Loretta Stinson
 Joe Nieves as Carl MacLaren, The Bartender
 Ellen D. Williams as Patrice
 Tracey Ullman as Genevieve Scherbatsky
 Cristine Rose as Virginia Mosby
 Anna Camp as Cassie
 Andrew Rannells as Darren
 Suzie Plakson as Judy Eriksen
 Abby Elliott as Jeanette Peterson
 Lou Ferrigno Jr. as Louis
 Ray Wise as Robin Scherbatsky, Sr.
 John Lithgow as Jerome Whittaker
 Ben Vereen as Sam Gibbs
 Taran Killam as Gary Blauman
 Rhys Darby as Hamish
 Virginia Williams as Claudia
 Matt Boren as Stuart
 Harry Groener as Clint
 Lin-Manuel Miranda as Gus
 Bryan Cranston as Hammond Druthers
 Jon Heder as Narshall
 James Van Der Beek as Simon Tremblay
 Stacy Keibler as Karina
 Nazanin Boniadi as Nora
 April Bowlby as Meg
 Katie Walder as Shannon
 Eva Amurri as Shelly
 Mark Derwin as Greg
 Rachel Bilson as Cindy
 Alan Thicke as himself
 Adam Paul as Mitch, The Naked Man
 Sarah Chalke as Stella Zinman
 Ashley Williams as Victoria
 Bill Fagerbakke as Marvin Eriksen Sr.
 Chris Kattan as himself/Jed Mosely
 Lucy Hale as Katie Scherbatsky
 Chris Elliott as Mickey Aldrin
 Kyle MacLachlan as The Captain
 Laura Bell Bundy as Becky
 Jennifer Morrison as Zoey Pierson
 Kal Penn as Kevin Venkataraghavan
 Alexis Denisof as Sandy Rivers
 David Burtka as Scooter
 Jorge Garcia as Steve "The Blitz" Henry
 Abigail Spencer as Blahblah/Carol
 Jai Rodriguez as Tom

Release

Promotion
How I Met Your Mothers cast and crew hosted a panel at the 2013 Comic-Con for the first time in the show's history to promote Season 9. The panel released a teaser trailer featuring Ted's children as adults, still listening to Ted tell his story eight years from when he first began. Angry at having spent years listening, they insist Ted finish his story so they can leave. The panel answered questions from fans as well as releasing select plot spoilers planned for the season.

Bays was enthusiastic about the trajectory of the season, saying that "we've never been in a place where it's July and we've plotted out the entire season, but we have this year because there's so much exciting stuff".

Distribution
Season 9 premiered on CBS on September 23, 2013, with two 22-minute episodes, and contained 24 episodes.

Reception
The ninth season of How I Met Your Mother received mostly positive reviews from critics, gaining a better reception than the previous season. The review aggregation website Rotten Tomatoes gave an 80% approval rating for the season with an average rating of 7.3/10, based on 10 reviews. At the end of the season, Max Nicholson of IGN gave the season a negative review, writing: "Many How I Met Your Mother fans felt betrayed after watching the series finale – and understandably so after Season 9 spent 22 of its 24 episodes building towards a wedding that was basically meaningless. In retrospect, almost any other arc would have made a better foundation for Season 9, including the series finale. In the end, unbalanced storytelling, lack of focus and unfunny detours led to the show's eventual downfall." Adam Vitcavage of Paste Magazine gave the season a lukewarm review, saying: "Nothing was over-the-top funny, but it was a perfect combination of laughter and sweet moments that really do make up for all of the lackluster episodes in the past few seasons."

Episodes

References

External links

 

9
2013 American television seasons
2014 American television seasons